Agra aurifera is a species of carabid beetle. The holotype was collected in Costa Rica and first described to science in 1940 by Max Liebke.

References 

Lebiinae
Beetles described in 1940